Edward Powell Carr (February 27, 1878 – March 16, 1947) was an American long-distance runner. He competed in the men's marathon at the 1904 Summer Olympics and the men's 5 miles and Men's 3200 metres steeplechase events at the 1908 Summer Olympics.

References

External links
 
 

1878 births
1947 deaths
Athletes (track and field) at the 1904 Summer Olympics
Athletes (track and field) at the 1908 Summer Olympics
American male long-distance runners
American male marathon runners
Olympic track and field athletes of the United States
Place of birth missing
American male steeplechase runners
20th-century American people